Yang Sok-il (or Yang Sokil, Yang Sogil, Yang Seok-il, born 13 August 1936) is a writer in Japanese of Korean nationality.  He was born in Osaka.

Yang first supported himself via various odd jobs, an experience that led to books based on the experience of taxi driving published in the 1980s and filmed as All Under the Moon (Tsuki wa dotchi ni dete iru Yōichi Sai). A large number of books followed.

The December 2000 issue of Yurīka / Eureka is devoted to Yang.

Yang's semi-autobiographical novel, Chi to Hone (Blood and Bones), was adapted as a theatrical film, directed by Yoichi Sai, starring Takeshi Kitano as Kim Shun-Pei, Kyōka Suzuki as Kim's wife, Joe Odagiri as son-in-law and Hirofumi Arai as eldest son and narrator. The film opened in Japan on 6 November 2004.

Notes

External links 

 Profile at J'Lit Books from Japan 
 Profile, Nikkei Torendi. 

1936 births
Living people
Japanese-language writers
Korean writers
Writers from Osaka
Zainichi Korean people